Gábor Márton (born 15 September 1966) is a Hungarian football manager and a former player.

Managerial career

Zalaegerszeg
On 10 February 2020, he was appointed as the manager of Zalaegerszegi TE. He managed to keep the team in the Nemzeti Bajnokság I. At the end of the 2019-20 Nemzeti Bajnokság I season, he was approached by Fehérvár FC.

Fehérvár
On 8 July 2020, he was appointed as the manager of Fehérvár FC. On 17 February 2021, he was sacked from Fehérvár after 4 defeats in five matches in the 2020–21 Nemzeti Bajnokság I season.

MTK Budapest
Márton was hired by MTK Budapest in November 2021. He was fired by MTK on 23 April 2022, with MTK winning 3 out of 17 league games under his management.

References

External links 
 
EUFO
HLSZ

1966 births
Living people
Hungarian footballers
Association football midfielders
Hungarian football managers
Hungary international footballers
Hungarian expatriate footballers
Expatriate footballers in France
Expatriate footballers in Belgium
Pécsi MFC players
K.R.C. Genk players
Budapest Honvéd FC players
Hapoel Kfar Saba F.C. players
Hapoel Petah Tikva F.C. players
Hapoel Tel Aviv F.C. players
Hapoel Rishon LeZion F.C. players
Nemzeti Bajnokság I players
Nemzeti Bajnokság II players
Belgian Pro League players
Ligue 1 players
Liga Leumit players
Israeli Premier League players
Pécsi MFC managers
Kaposvári Rákóczi FC managers
Zalaegerszegi TE managers
Sportspeople from Pécs
Nemzeti Bajnokság I managers
MTK Budapest FC managers